UWC may refer to:
Ukrainian World Congress, the umbrella organization of Ukrainian diaspora communities. 
Ulster Workers' Council, a grouping of loyalist and unionist workers in Northern Ireland responsible for the 1974 Ulster Workers' Strike 
Unified World Champion
United World Colleges, a group of international schools.
University of the Western Cape, a university in South Africa.
University of Wisconsin Colleges
User Worked Crossing, a type of level crossing
Universal Wrestling Corporation, the original name given to World Championship Wrestling in 1988 and from 2001 to 2017
UWC (video game), a  unreleased wrestling game for NES
Union of World Cartoonists.